Thomas G. West (born 1945) is an American academic. He is a professor of Politics at Hillsdale College, and the author of three books.

Early life
West was born in 1945. He received his B.A. from Cornell University in 1967 and his Ph.D. from Claremont Graduate University in 1974. He served in the Vietnam War as a lieutenant in the U.S. Army in 1969–70.

Career
West taught at the University of Dallas from 1974 to 2011. Since 2011, he has been a professor of Politics at Hillsdale College.

West was Bradley Resident Scholar at the Heritage Foundation in 1988–89, and Salvatori Visiting Scholar at Claremont McKenna College from 1990 to 1992. He is a director and senior fellow of the Claremont Institute, which has supported and publicized his research.  He has translated, with Grace Starry West, Plato's Charmides, Euthyphro, Apology of Socrates, and Crito, as well as Aristophanes' Clouds. He has also published Vindicating the Founders, an analysis and defense of American political thought in the founding of the United States in the 18th century.

West supported Donald J. Trump during the 2016 presidential election.

Selected works and appearances

Books
 
The Political Theory of the American Founding: Natural Rights, Public Policy, and the Moral Conditions of Freedom (Cambridge University Press, 2017)
Vindicating the Founders: Race, Sex, Class, and Justice in the Origins of America (Lanham, MD: Rowman and Littlefield, 1997; paperback edition, 2001)
 (author and translator) Plato's "Apology of Socrates": An Interpretation, with a New Translation (Ithaca, NY: Cornell University Press, 1979)

Edited volumes 
 (co-edited with Ronald J. Pestritto) Modern America and the Legacy of the Founding (Lanham, MD: Lexington Books, 2006).
 (co-edited with Ronald J. Pestritto) Challenges to the American Founding: Slavery, Historicism, and Progressivism in the Nineteenth Century (Lanham, MD: Lexington Books, 2004).
 (co-edited with Ronald J. Pestritto) The American Founding and the Social Compact (Lanham, MD: Lexington Books, 2003).
 (editor and introduction) Algernon Sidney, Discourses Concerning Government (Indianapolis: Liberty Classics, 1990; revised edition 1996).
 (co-edited with John E. Alvis) Shakespeare as Political Thinker (Durham: Carolina Academic Press, 1981; revised and expanded edition, Wilmington, DE: Intercollegiate Studies Institute Books, 2000).

Public appearances
 Does Our Constitution Still Matter?  (panel discussion with Robert D. Cohen, Allen Fishburn, and Calvin C. Jillson)
 American Federalism in Theory and Practice (panelist, 2011 Constitution Day Celebration)
 Should Conservatives Today Accept the New Deal as a Done Deal? (panelist, 2012 Constitution Day Celebration)
 Locke and the Founders on Sex and Marriage (lecture at University of Dallas)

References

External links

 Academia.edu profile (Selected book chapters, reviews and journal articles)
 Contributor page at Claremont Review of Books website
 Companion website to Vindicating the Founders

Living people
Cornell University alumni
Claremont Graduate University alumni
University of Dallas faculty
Hillsdale College faculty
1945 births